Smile is the fourteenth full-length album by Japanese band Boris. It was released through Diwphalanx Records in early 2008 (late 2008 for the live version accordingly), featuring guest musicians Michio Kurihara of Ghost and Stephen O'Malley of Sunn O))), both of whom have collaborated with Boris in the past. Shortly after this initial release, the album was released by American label Southern Lord with a slightly different track listing, different artwork (by Stephen O'Malley), and an almost entirely different sound. The first 3000 copies of this edition include a DVD containing videos for "Statement", "Pink" and "My Neighbor Satan".

Notably, this release is the second Boris album to feature vocals on every track (the first, excluding any one-track albums, was Amplifier Worship). Also, it delves more into experimental tendencies with a more manipulated sound, use of drum machines, and even experiments with sampled tracks (notably, "Dead Destination" is essentially "No Ones Grieve part 2" from The Thing Which Solomon Overlooked 2 with additional vocals; part of the seventh song from Vein is used in the untitled final track).

The album can also be seen as humorous since Boris have referenced this album in an interview with Terrorizer Magazine as "un-cool" and "The sell-out album" with comical lyricism (A prime example being the song "Buzz-In" which is about the Melvins live video Salad of a Thousand Delights), an 80s look for the band themselves, and the tones of voice in some of the songs.

The album charted on the Billboard Top Heatseekers chart at number 20.

Track listing
The different versions of Smile contain different mixes: the English version was mixed by Souichiro Nakamura, while the Japanese version was handled by You Ishihara.

Diwphalanx CD

Disk Union vinyl
Limited to 500 copies.

Southern Lord CD

Southern Lord vinyl
Several limited-run colors of the Southern Lord vinyl have been released: clear orange (7000 copies), opaque orange (1000 copies), grey (1000 copies), yellow (1000 copies), and black (3000 copies). All versions contain the same music. The mixes here are similar to the Southern Lord CD release but the duration of some tracks have been changed, in part due to the addition of two bonus tracks.

Southern Lord bonus DVD
The bonus DVD came with certain limited editions of the Southern Lord CD, limited to 3000 copies. It features three official music videos.

"Choice Cuts" Amazon exclusive drop-card
All copies of Smile sold through Amazon.com received this additional free download-only collection.

Personnel
 Takeshi - guitar, bass guitar, vocals
 Wata - guitar, vocals
 Atsuo - drums, percussion, vocals
 Michio Kurihara - guitar on "My Neighbour Satan", "Flower, Sun, Rain", and "You Were Holding An Umbrella"
 Stephen O'Malley - guitar on "Untitled"

References

External links
 

2008 albums
Boris (band) albums
Southern Lord Records albums